Vladyslav Serhiyovych Veleten (born 1 October 2002) is a Ukrainian professional footballer who plays as midfielder for Kolos Kovalivka.

Career

Early years
Veleten is a product of the Dynamo Kyiv youth academy in his native Kyiv and competed for this team in the Ukrainian Youth Football League.

Kolos Kovalivka
In October 2021 he joined the senior squad of Ukrainian Premier League side Kolos Kovalivka and made his league debut against Dnipro-1 on 16 October 2021 as a second-half substitute.

References

External links
 
 

2002 births
Living people
Footballers from Kyiv
Ukrainian footballers
Association football midfielders
FC Kolos Kovalivka players
Ukrainian Premier League players